Jordan Ashley Adams (born May 24, 1981) is an American-Canadian former professional basketball player and coach who was drafted by the Minnesota Lynx with the 18th overall pick in the 2003 WNBA draft. She played college basketball for New Mexico from 1999 to 2003, and represented the Canadian national team multiple times. In the 2010 FIBA World Championship for Women, Adams averaged 2.7 points and 1.7 rebounds per game. Adams was inducted into the University of New Mexico Athletics Hall of Fame in 2012.

High school career
Adams played both basketball and volleyball at Moapa Valley High School in Overton, Nevada, where she was a four-time state volleyball champion and earned the state volleyball most valuable player (MVP) award on two occasions. Adams also led her team to the 1999 state basketball championship, and was named the Nevada Gatorade Player of the Year.

New Mexico statistics
Source

WNBA career statistics

Regular season

|-
| style="text-align:left;"|2003
| style="text-align:left;"|Minnesota
| 10 || 0 || 9.6 || .394 || .417|| 1.000 || 2.3 || 0.4 || 0.2 || 0.3 || 1.0 || 4.0

Later career
Adams first coached at Moapa Valley, where she was head girls' basketball coach for two seasons, starting in 2006. She returned to New Mexico in 2008 as the Lobos' director of women's basketball operations for three years, and later worked as an assistant coach in the sport at University of California, Riverside and Pepperdine for a total of four seasons, until 2015.

Personal life
Adams's half-brother and Gonzaga power forward Kyle Wiltjer played for the Houston Rockets of the NBA and various European clubs.

Adams is married to Eric Smith, an Eastern New Mexico University graduate; they have two daughters. The couple co-founded Nuevo, a New Mexican cuisine-related subscription box, in January 2019. She earned her bachelor's degree in undergraduate studies with an emphasis in journalism and physical education from the University of New Mexico in 2003, and also earned her master's in special education from Western Governors University, in Salt Lake City, Utah, in 2010.

References

External links
WNBA bio
New Mexico bio
Usbasket.com profile

1981 births
Living people
Basketball players from Spokane, Washington
Canadian women's basketball players
American women's basketball players
American emigrants to Canada
Canadian expatriate basketball people in France
Canadian expatriate basketball people in Greece
Canadian people of American descent
Centers (basketball)
Citizens of Canada through descent
Forwards (basketball)
Minnesota Lynx draft picks
Minnesota Lynx players
New Mexico Lobos women's basketball players
Pepperdine Waves women's basketball coaches
UC Riverside Highlanders women's basketball coaches